"Handog ng Pilipino sa Mundo", released in English as "A New and Better Way—The People's Anthem," is a 1986 song recorded in Filipino by a supergroup composed of 15 Filipino artists. The song serves to commemorate the bloodless People Power Revolution which ended President Ferdinand Marcos's 20-year rule, as well as a benefit single for the rehabilitation of Radio Veritas, a public affairs radio station instrumental in the revolution. The lyrics of the song are inscribed on a wall of Our Lady of EDSA Shrine, the center of the revolution.

Background

Ramon Chuaying, head of WEA Records (now Universal Records), commissioned singer-songwriter Jim Paredes of APO Hiking Society to write a song inspired by the People Power Revolution for the company's upcoming compilation album of patriotic songs. Paredes wrote the song in three minutes, with no revisions. The song eventually became its carrier single. The song was then performed by artists who became actively involved during the People Power Revolution. An English version of this song was also made entitled "A New and Better Way - The People's Anthem", released in Australia and the United Kingdom. Both the original and English version were released as singles, with the proceeds to be donated for the rehabilitation of DZRV, whose main transmitter was destroyed by Marcos' troops while covering the events of the EDSA Revolution.

The English version of the hit single includes a letter from Manila Archbishop Jaime Cardinal Sin, who played a significant role in the People Power Revolution through Radio Veritas.

A music video was also made for the song made by director Mike de Leon. Leaders featured included senators Jose W. Diokno, Rene Saguisag, Butz Aquino, Lorenzo Tañada, and Corazon Aquino with Doy Laurel. Kris Aquino, then a teen, appeared in the music video with the artists that performed. National heroes since the Spanish period and prominent scenes from the revolution were also featured. The video was removed by censors shortly after it aired in television as the video containing crowds battering pictures of Ferdinand and Imelda Marcos might be "too strong" to the public. The music video was revived decades later through the Filipino TV channel Myx, uploaded on YouTube by Jim Paredes, and a shorter edit on Vimeo by Mike de Leon, using less footage of the singers and focusing more on the scenes of the revolution.

Featured artists

APO Hiking Society
Celeste Legaspi
Coritha & Eric
Edru Abraham
Gretchen Barretto
Ivy Violan
Inang Laya
Joseph Olfindo
Kuh Ledesma
Leah Navarro
Lester Demetillo
Noel Trinidad
Subas Herrero

2011 revival
As part of the 25th anniversary of the EDSA Revolution, broadcast television network ABS-CBN created a cover version of the song, with slightly different arrangements.

Artists

In order of appearance:

Gary Valenciano
Vina Morales
Martin Nievera
Zsa Zsa Padilla
Christian Bautista
Aiza Seguerra
Erik Santos
Toni Gonzaga
Piolo Pascual
Sam Milby
Juris Fernandez
Yeng Constantino
Jovit Baldivino

In popular culture
During the funeral of Corazon Aquino, the song was performed by several artists that include the APO Hiking Society, Jose Mari Chan, Sarah Geronimo, Piolo Pascual, Lea Salonga, Regine Velasquez, Ogie Alcasid, Zsa Zsa Padilla, Martin Nievera, Erik Santos, Jed Madela and Dulce. This version of the song is included in the album "Paalam, Maraming Salamat Pres. Aquino: A Memorial Tribute Soundtrack" by Star Music.

In 2016, the song figured in nationwide protests in the aftermath of the burial of Philippine dictator Ferdinand Marcos at the Libingan ng mga Bayani.

See also
"Magkaisa"

References

All-star recordings
1986 songs
1986 singles
Filipino patriotic songs
People Power Revolution
Tagalog-language songs